The Joyrex Tape is the name given to a collection of unreleased tracks from the early 1990s by Richard D. James, best known by his alias Aphex Twin. The original tape was copied from one of James' DATs sometime in the 1990s and was leaked onto the internet in 2011. In January 2015, James uploaded high quality versions of the tracks to SoundCloud as part of a track dump.

History
The tape was reportedly found during a house party. Richard D. James had passed out, and one of the guests went into James' room and made a copy of one of his DATs. Since it was hastily copied, the sound quality is poor and it plays at the wrong speed. Subsequent copying further degraded the clarity.

The existence of the tape was rumored for some time until the WATMM forum administrator Joyrex put up short snippets of the tracks, explaining the origins of the tape and his eventual possession of a copy. Contrary to common belief, Joyrex did not leak the tracks online. Rather, this collection is referred to as the Joyrex Tape since it was Joyrex who verified their existence with the audio samples and via his communication with Richard D. James at the time.

Before the leaking of the full tracks, a WATMM user sent an email to Rephlex, who then emailed Joyrex the following response:

High quality versions of tracks 1–6, 8-9, 13, and 14 were uploaded to SoundCloud in early 2015 by James. In response to a comment on "Gear Smudge", James said that track 11 was done with Cylob, and that he would need permission to post it.

Track 7 is a demo version of "Praze-An-Beeble Mix" subsequently released on the Ventolin EP, with very subtle differences between the two. Others tracks resemble the unreleased Melodies from Mars album. Some of the tracks have been played live: "Clapstab" was played at the State-X New Forms festival, while "World Waver" and "Phuqed Up" were played at Melt 2006. Tracks 2-5 are four of the seven Analogue Bubblebath 6 songs released on SoundCloud.

Track listing

Note: The Joyrex Tape doesn't include track titles; those above (excluding track 7) are taken from the SoundCloud uploads.

Personnel 
Richard D. James – performance, production
Cylob – performance on track 11

References

External links
 
 user18081971 on SoundCloud

Aphex Twin albums
Bootleg recordings
Unreleased albums